Arnaldo Ninchi  (17 December 1935 – 6 May 2013) was an Italian actor, voice actor and basketball player.

Ninchi was born in Pesaro, the son of the actor Annibale.  In his youth he was a basketball player, debuting on the national team at just 17 years old. In 1959 he graduated from the Silvio D'Amico National Academy of Dramatic Art and began working on stage. He later founded his own stage company. He was also active in television and film. His films include works directed by Claude Chabrol, Giuliano Montaldo, Lina Wertmüller, Pupi Avati, Silvio Soldini. He was cousin of the actress Ave Ninchi.

References

External links
 

1935 births
2013 deaths
People from Pesaro
Italian male film actors
Italian male stage actors
Italian male television actors
20th-century Italian male actors
21st-century Italian male actors
Accademia Nazionale di Arte Drammatica Silvio D'Amico alumni
Italian male voice actors
Italian men's basketball players
Sportspeople from the Province of Pesaro and Urbino